The 1995 Cal Poly Mustangs football team represented California Polytechnic State University during the 1995 NCAA Division I-AA football season.

Cal Poly competed in the last year of the American West Conference (AWC). They would compete as a Division I-AA Independent starting in 1996. The 1995 Mustangs were led by second-year head coach Andre Patterson and played home games at Mustang Stadium in San Luis Obispo, California. They finished the season with a record of five wins and six losses (5–6, 2–1 AWC). Overall, the team outscored its opponents 411–271 for the season.

Schedule

Notes

References

Cal Poly
Cal Poly Mustangs football seasons
Cal Poly Mustangs football